Aaron Chautezz Hayden (born April 13, 1973) is a former running back in the National Football League who played for the San Diego Chargers, the Green Bay Packers, and the Philadelphia Eagles.  Hayden was drafted in the fourth round of the 1995 NFL Draft out of the University of Tennessee.  He played 4 years in the NFL, and retired in 1998.

College career 
Hayden attended the University of Tennessee, where he played for the Tennessee Volunteers for his entire college career.

College statistics

Professional career 
Hayden was drafted by the San Diego Chargers during the 1995 NFL draft in the 4th round, 104th overall.

San Diego Chargers 
During the 1995 season, Hayden would make his NFL regular season debut in Week 11 against the Denver Broncos. However, it wouldn't be until Week 14 before getting his first career touchdown in a 31–13 win against the Cleveland Browns. He would have 2 touchdowns that game. He would also make a start in the playoffs where the Chargers would lose against the Indianapolis Colts in the wild card round. Hayden would rush 80 yards in 18 carries in the game.

Hayden would return to San Diego for the 1996 season for 11 games, where he would record 55 carries for 166 yards, with no touchdowns.

Green Bay Packers 
For the 1997 season, Hayden was signed by the Green Bay Packers. With Green Bay, he rushed for 148 yards with 32 carries in the regular season, helping the Packer make the playoffs. Throughout the playoffs, Hayden would see little time on the field. The Packers would end up making Super Bowl XXXII, losing 24–31 against the Denver Broncos.

NFL career statistics

Regular season

Postseason

References

1973 births
Living people
Players of American football from Detroit
American football running backs
Tennessee Volunteers football players
San Diego Chargers players
Green Bay Packers players
Philadelphia Eagles players